Henry Briggs may refer to:
Henry Briggs (mathematician) (1561–1630),  English mathematician
Henry Perronet Briggs (1793–1844), English painter
Henry George Briggs (1824–1872), English merchant, traveller, and orientalist
Henry Shaw Briggs (1824–1887), Union Army general in the American Civil War
Sir Henry Briggs (politician) (1844–1919), Australian politician
Henry Briggs (footballer) (1871–1913), English footballer

See also
Harry Briggs (1923–2005), English footballer